Eko Maulana Ali (26 September 1951 – 30 July 2013) was the governor of Bangka Belitung from April 2007 until his death in July 2013.

Death
Ali died on 30 July 2013, aged 61, from complications of kidney disease in MMC Hospital, Jakarta.

References

External links
  http://diskusi.bangkapos.com/viewtopic.php?f=24&t=2018

1951 births
2013 deaths
Governors of the Bangka Belitung Islands
People from West Bangka Regency
Deaths from kidney disease